The 1982 United States elections were held on November 2, 1982. The elections occurred in the middle of Republican President Ronald Reagan's first term and after the 1980 United States census. Neither chamber of Congress changed hands, the Democrats increased its majority in the House of Representatives and gained seats in the Senate but failed to gain control of the chamber.

The party balance in the Senate remained practically unchanged; Democrats only gained one seat after a Democratic-leaning Independent left the Senate. Democrats won the nationwide popular vote for the House of Representatives by a margin of 11.8 points and gained 27 seats, cementing their majority in that chamber. The House elections took place after the 1980 United States Census and the subsequent Congressional re-apportionment. In the gubernatorial elections, Democrats won a net gain of seven seats.

The Democratic election gains were largely due to President Ronald Reagan's unpopularity as a result of the deepening 1982 recession, which many voters blamed on his economic policies. The Democrats' gains put a check on Reagan's policies, as the incoming Congress (particularly the House) was significantly less open to Reagan's conservative policies. Despite the Democratic electoral gains, this election was the first time that the Republican Party had successfully defended a majority in either chamber of Congress since 1928.

See also
 1982 United States House of Representatives elections
 1982 United States Senate elections
 1982 United States gubernatorial elections

References

 
1982
United States midterm elections
November 1982 events in the United States